The ROY Files is an Irish-based British children's television show, filmed in Dublin, Ireland, which was broadcast by CBBC in the United Kingdom and ABC Me in Australia. It began airing 7 December 2015. The show centres on the title character Roy O'Brien, the 11-year-old animated son of a live-action family. The series is a spin-off from ROY, an Irish-British television show which ran from 1 July 2009 to 7 April 2015. It stars Jason Cullen (replacing Scott Graham as Roy), Simon Delaney, Cathy Belton and Martha Byrne.

Plot
The show gives an insight into Roy O'Brien's personal life. The episodes consist of O'Brien creating a scrapbook of his life - one which he has to hand in to History teacher and vice-principal, Mr Hammond. It features highlights from all the four series of ROY, as well as new scenes. The series also talks about life living with teachers, coping with bullying and being yourself.

References

2010s Irish television series
Irish children's television shows
BBC children's television shows
Animated television series about children